North Cambridge, also known as "Area 11", is a neighborhood of Cambridge, Massachusetts bounded by Porter Square and the Fitchburg Line railroad tracks on the south, the city of Somerville on the northeast, Alewife Brook and the town of Arlington on the northwest, and the town of Belmont on the west. In 2005 it had a population of 10,642 residents living in 4,699 households, and the average income was $44,784.  In 2010, the racial demographics for the neighborhood were 57.6% White, 20% Black, 15.1% Asian/Pacific Islander, 7.3% Hispanic origin, 0.3% Native American, 2.4% other race.

The main commercial areas of North Cambridge are situated along Alewife Brook Parkway and Massachusetts Avenue.  A third area, Davis Square, in Somerville, also exerts considerable influence on the North Cambridge neighborhood.

Four roads span the railroad tracks, connecting the bulk of North Cambridge with other neighborhoods of Cambridge. From east to west, these are: Mass. Ave. (route MA-2A), Walden Street, Sherman Street (grade crossing), and Alewife Brook Parkway (carrying routes MA-2, MA-16, and US-3).

Notable residents 
Thomas Danehy
Pauline Elizabeth Hopkins
Tip O'Neill
Reverend Peter Thomas Stanford

See also 
Alewife Linear Park
Lexington and West Cambridge Railroad
St. John the Evangelist Church
Rindge Towers (Fresh Pond Apartments)
Walden Street Cattle Pass
Watson's Corner

References

Neighborhoods in Cambridge, Massachusetts